Plumsted can refer to:

People
 Clement Plumsted, 18th century mayor of Philadelphia
 William Plumsted, 18th century mayor of Philadelphia, son of Clement Plumsted

Places
 Plumsted Township, New Jersey
See also:
Plumstead (disambiguation)